Brahim Thiam (born 24 February 1974) is a former professional footballer who played as a defender or midfielder. Born in France, he made 17 appearances the Mali national team at international level.

Career
Thiam was born in Bobigny, France. He was said to have a good midfield partnership with Stoke City's Mamady Sidibe and Real Madrid's Mahamadou Diarra when playing internationally. He joined Stade de Reims in January 2009.

Post-playing career
After retiring from playing, Thiam worked as a consultant of beIN Sports.

In September 2019 Yunis Abdelhamid's agent Alain Gauci accused Thiam of illegally acting as an agent on Abdelhamid's behalf. Thiam rejected the allegations as "false". In October 2019, the Reims prosecutor opened a "preliminary investigation".

References

External links
 
 

Living people
1974 births
Malian footballers
French footballers
Association football defenders
Mali international footballers
2004 African Cup of Nations players
Levante UD footballers
Málaga CF players
French people of Malian descent
Red Star F.C. players
FC Istres players
Stade Malherbe Caen players
Stade de Reims players
Ligue 1 players
Ligue 2 players
French expatriate footballers
French expatriate sportspeople in Spain
Expatriate footballers in Spain